The members of the National Assembly of Zambia from 2002 until 2006 were elected on 27 December 2001. Of the 150 elected members, 69 were from the Movement for Multi-Party Democracy, 49 from the United Party for National Development, thirteen from the United National Independence Party, twelve from the Forum for Democracy and Development, four from the Heritage Party and one from the Patriotic Front and Zambia Republican Party, together with one independent. The newly elected National Assembly convened for the first time on 25 January 2002.

List of members

Elected members

Replacements by by-election

Non-elected members

References

2002